R Akhanda Srinivas Murthy is an Indian politician and a member of the Karnataka Legislative Assembly. He is the representative of the Pulakeshinagar constituency as a member of the Indian National Congress. He was previously a representative of the constituency from 2013-2018 as a member of the Janata Dal (Secular), following which he resigned to join the Indian National Congress and was elected for a second term securing the highest margin of victory in the 2018 Karnataka Legislative Assembly election.

In August 2020, a violent riot broke out in Bangalore, provoked by an inflammatory Facebook post on Muhammad that was allegedly shared by the nephew of Murthy.

References 

Living people
Indian National Congress politicians from Karnataka
Janata Dal (Secular) politicians
Karnataka MLAs 2018–2023
Year of birth missing (living people)